Streptoglossa cylindriceps is a species of flowering plant in the family Asteraceae and grows in Western Australia, South Australia and the Northern Territory. It is a ground cover or ascending perennial or annual herb with bluish purple or pink flowers.

Description
Streptoglossa cylindriceps is a short-lived, perennial or prostrate herb with faintly aromatic, glandular leaves and stems covered in soft, thin hairs.

Taxonomy and naming
Streptoglossa cylindriceps was first formally described in 1981 by Clyde Robert Dunlop  and the description was published in  Journal of the Adelaide Botanic Garden. The specific epithet (cylindriceps)  means "cylinder" and "headed".

Distribution and habitat
This streptoglossa grows in drier regions in a variety of situations and soils including red sand or clay, floodplains, rocky creeks and occasionally flooded swamps.

References

Asterales of Australia
Flora of the Northern Territory
Flora of South Australia
Flora of Western Australia
cylindriceps